is a Japanese open-source developer and alpha blogger, known for his blog 404 Blog Not Found (ranked #5 in Japan). He is also the former CTO of Livedoor.

Background 

Kogai went to middle school, but he had problems with formal education and skipped classes. Immediately after he graduated from middle school at the age of 16 he passed the high-school equivalence exam, and up until age 18 he spent his time teaching senior students as a tutor and cram school teacher. He then entered the University of California, Berkeley.

During his fourth year at university, his family's home burnt down, and he left school. He made a living with the computer skills he had learnt at university, and at age 29 was headhunted by Takafumi Horie to join Livin' On the Edge (now Livedoor).

Works

Self-authored

Co-authored

References

External links 
Homepage in English

Japanese bloggers
People in information technology
Living people
Year of birth missing (living people)